The Beall–Dawson House is a historic home located at Rockville, Montgomery County, Maryland, United States. It is a -story Federal house, three bays wide by two deep, constructed of Flemish bond brick on the front facade and common bond elsewhere. Outbuildings on the property include an original brick dairy house and a mid-19th century one-room Gothic Revival frame doctor's office which was moved to the site for use as a museum. The house was constructed in 1815.

It serves as the headquarters of the Montgomery County Historical Society which maintains the house as an early 19th-century period historic house museum.  The house also include indoor slave quarters, and two rooms with changing exhibits of local history.

The Beall–Dawson House was listed on the National Register of Historic Places in 1973.

The property also includes the Stonestreet Museum of 19th Century Medicine, a one-room doctor's office with medical and pharmaceutical tools, furniture, and books from the 19th and early 20th centuries.

History
The Beall–Dawson House was built circa 1815 for Upton Beall and his wife and daughters. Beall, from a prominent Georgetown family, was Clerk of the Court for the county, and he wanted a home that would reflect his wealth and status. In 1815 Rockville was a small rural community, despite being the county seat and an important cross-roads town. Beall's large brick Federal-style home, built overlooking Commerce Lane (now West Montgomery Avenue),  was designed to impress both inside and out.

After Beall's death in 1827, ownership of the house moved to his wife, Jane, and three surviving daughters, Mathilda, Jane Elizabeth, and Margaret. Jane Beall never remarried, and her three daughters never married. The daughters lived in the house their entire lives. After Mathilda and Jane Elizabeth died, Margaret Beall invited a cousin, Amelia Somervell, to live in the house with her. Somervell married John L. Dawson, a local farmer and landowner, and lived at the house with her husband and nine children (eight of whom survived to adulthood). When the last of Beall's daughters died in the late 1800s, she left the house to three of Somervell-Dawson's daughters, continuing the tradition of three sisters being owners of the house.

As money grew tight, the Dawsons turned to the house to provide an income, starting a restaurant that ran out of the front yard, teaching dancing lessons to neighborhood children, and taking on boarders. Despite the Dawsons' best efforts, however, the house began to suffer from neglect.

After the last of the Dawson sisters died, the house was sold to the Davis family in 1946. The Davises, who had been looking to take on a fixer-upper, set to restoring the house to its former grandeur. The family returned much of the house to how it would have looked while under the Beall's family care along with adding an addition to the side of what used to be the servants/slave quarters that housed a modern kitchen and dressing the original kitchen as the family's dining room.

After Edwin Davis's death, Mrs. Davis's passion for their project waned and she sold the house to the City of Rockville, and it became the Montgomery County Historical Society's headquarters.

References

External links

Montgomery County Historical Society
, including photo in 1976, at Maryland Historical Trust website

Houses completed in 1815
Houses on the National Register of Historic Places in Maryland
Federal architecture in Maryland
Museums in Montgomery County, Maryland
Historic house museums in Maryland
Houses in Montgomery County, Maryland
Medical museums in Maryland
Buildings and structures in Rockville, Maryland
National Register of Historic Places in Montgomery County, Maryland
Slave cabins and quarters in the United States